Dmitry Stepanovich Polyansky (– 8 October 2001) was a Soviet statesman who was First Deputy Chairman of the Council of Ministers of the Soviet Union from 1965 to 1973. From 1958 to 1962 he was Chairman of the Council of Ministers of the Russian SFSR, equivalent to a Premier in of one of the 15 Soviet Socialist Republics that comprised the Soviet Union.

Polyansky was awarded four Orders of Lenin. His wife Galina died in 2005.

References

1917 births
2001 deaths
People from Luhansk Oblast
People from Slavyanoserbsky Uyezd
Ukrainian people in the Russian Empire
Politburo of the Central Committee of the Communist Party of the Soviet Union members
People's commissars and ministers of the Soviet Union
Fourth convocation members of the Soviet of the Union
Fifth convocation members of the Soviet of the Union
Sixth convocation members of the Soviet of the Union
Seventh convocation members of the Soviet of Nationalities
Eighth convocation members of the Soviet of Nationalities
Ninth convocation members of the Soviet of Nationalities
Ambassadors of the Soviet Union to Japan
Heads of government of the Russian Soviet Federative Socialist Republic
Recipients of the Order of Lenin